The 2016–17 Ford Trophy was the 46th season of the official List A cricket tournament in New Zealand, and the sixth in a sponsorship deal between New Zealand Cricket and Ford Motor Company. The competition ran from 15 January to 18 February 2017. The final was played between Canterbury and Wellington. Canterbury won the final by 28 runs with Peter Fulton scoring the fastest century in a List A cricket match in New Zealand.

Points table

 Teams qualified for the finals

Fixtures

Round 1

Round 2

Round 3

Round 4

Round 5

Round 6

Round 7

Round 8

Finals

References

External links
 Series home at ESPN Cricinfo

Ford Trophy
2016–17 New Zealand cricket season
Ford Trophy